The St. Nicholas Cathedral  also called St Nicholas of Bari Cathedral (Nhà Thờ Chình Toà Thánh Nicola Bari) is a Roman Catholic cathedral, seat of the diocese of Da Lat, suffragan of the Archdiocese of Ho Chi Minh (alternatively still called Saigon). It is located in Da Lat, capital of Lam Dong province in the Central Highlands of Vietnam. There are five masses every Sunday. The building was built as a Catholic parish by the French in 1931-1932 in an eclectic style Romanesque, but the interior was not completed until 1942. It replaces an old church built in 1917 with modifications in the chancel.

The town in the mountains at 1,500 meters above sea level was then where the colonial elite and the Vietnamese came to rest and escape the heat. It is also a place where tuberculosis patients came for treatment in sanatoriums. The Pasteur Institute was opened in 1935. There was a European cemetery around the church, which is no longer in use.

See also
Roman Catholicism in Vietnam
St. Nicholas Cathedral (disambiguation)

References

Roman Catholic cathedrals in Vietnam
Da Lat
Roman Catholic churches completed in 1942
1932 establishments in Vietnam
20th-century Roman Catholic church buildings in Vietnam